This List of Morgan State University Athletic Hall of Fame is a list of inductees into the Athletic Hall of Fame at Morgan State University.

History
Initially established in 1959 by the Morgan State University Athletic Department, all nominations and inductions are now overseen by the Morgan State University Varsity "M" Club.

Selection process
The Hall of Fame is an association of those athletes who attended Morgan State University, were nominated, and then selected for Hall of Fame recognition. Nominations cannot be considered until at least 10 years have passed since the applicant's graduation or exit from the university. Student-athlete nominees must have been a record holder or an outstanding performer while at the university and in good academic standing.

Induction ceremony
Finalists are inducted at an Annual Hall of Fame Induction luncheon during the Fall of each academic year. Inductees are honored at half-time ceremonies during the Morgan State University football homecoming game and a commemorative plaque is place in the Hall of Fame.

Facility
The Morgan State University Athletic Hall of Fame is located in the Talmadge Marse Hill Fieldhouse on the campus of Morgan State University.

Inductees

Baseball

Basketball

Coaches

Football

Lacrosse

Swimming

Track and Field

External links
Hall of Fame webpage

References

Hall
College sports halls of fame in the United States
Halls of fame in Maryland
Sports hall of fame inductees
Awards established in 1959